Irakli Svanidze (born July 2, 1996) is a Georgian rugby union player. His position is fullback, and he currently plays for Jiki Gori in the Georgia Championship and the Georgia national team. In September 2019 He married Mariam Burjaliani.

References

Rugby union players from Georgia (country)
Living people
Rugby union players from Tbilisi
1994 births
Rugby union locks
Georgia international rugby union players